Parkia is a genus of flowering plants in the family Fabaceae. It belongs to the mimosoid clade of the subfamily Caesalpinioideae. Several species are known as African locust bean.

In 1995, about 31 species were known. Four more species were outlined in 2009.

Parkia species are found throughout the tropics, with four species in Africa, about ten in Asia, and about 20 in the neotropics. The neotropical species were revised in 1986.<ref name="hopkins1986">Helen C.F. Hopkins and Marlene Freitas Da Silva. 1986. "Parkia (Leguminosae: Mimosoideae) (Flora Neotropica Monograph No. 43) with Dimorphandra (Caesalpiniaceae) (FN Monograph No. 44)". In: Flora Neotropica (series). The New York Botanical Garden Press.</ref>

Species
, Plants of the World Online (POWO) recognised the following species:
 Parkia bahiae 
 Parkia balslevii 
 Parkia barnebyana 
 Parkia bicolor  – African locust-bean
 Parkia biglandulosa 
 Parkia biglobosa 
 Parkia cachimboensis 
 Parkia decussata 
 Parkia discolor 
 Parkia filicina 
 Parkia filicoidea 
 Parkia gigantocarpa 
 Parkia igneiflora 
 Parkia insignis 
 Parkia intermedia 
 Parkia javanica 
 Parkia korom 
 Parkia leiophylla 
 Parkia lutea 
 Parkia madagascariensis 
 Parkia multijuga 
 Parkia nana 
 Parkia nitida 
 Parkia panurensis 
 Parkia paraensis 
 Parkia parrii 
 Parkia parvifoliola 
 Parkia paya 
 Parkia pendula 
 Parkia platycephala 
 Parkia reticulata 
 Parkia sherfeseei 
 Parkia singularis 
 Parkia speciosa  – twisted cluster bean, stink bean
 Parkia sumatrana 
 Parkia timoriana  – tree bean
 Parkia truncata 
 Parkia ulei 
 Parkia velutina 
 Parkia versteeghii''

References

 
Fabaceae genera